Ara Vladimirovich Arush (pronounced Ara Arushanyan) (born January 7, 1974, Stepanakert, Nagorno-Karabakh), is a Russian-Armenian film director, producer and screenwriter. Carrying citizenships of Russia and Armenia and living in Yerevan, he is the founder of the companies Digidez Studio and KenigArts Pictures.

The Hunter, his debut work, has been shown at festivals including the 66th Cannes Film Festival 2013, Jagran Film Festival, Mumbai (India), Frederick Film Festival, Maryland (USA), Duhok Film Festival (Iraq), Suchitra Short film festival (Bangalor, India), Lakecity Film Festival (India), European Independent Film Festival (Paris, France). It will also be shown at the Golden Apricot, Yerevan International Film Festival.

Filmography

Film director 

 Little Dragon- feature film, biography, action, oriental. Acting project. 
 The Hunter- completed project, 2013 https://www.youtube.com/watch?v=6K43oxMVD2w

References

External links 
 КиноПоиск: Ara Arush
 

Armenian film directors
1974 births
Living people
Russian people of Armenian descent
Armenian screenwriters
Armenian film producers